Authie is a commune in the Somme department in Hauts-de-France in northern France.

The commune was led by the elected mayor Henri Macron (the great-grandfather of Emmanuel Macron, current President of France), from 1953 to 1964.

See also
Communes of the Somme department

References

Communes of Somme (department)